The Etchegoin Formation is a Pliocene epoch geologic formation in the lower half of the San Joaquin Valley in central California.

Geology
The shallow-water marine sandstone formation is found across the central and southern San Joaquin Valley, and with the overlying Pliocene nonmarine sand San Joaquin Formation, is associated with the numerous oil fields there. The White Wolf Fault forms its southern boundary. It overlies the Antelope Shale unit of the Monterey Formation in its central and western sections.

In its southeastern section it is part of the Kern River Series, which is divided into an upper unit named the Kern River Beds Formation, a lower unit named the Chanac Formation, with the wedge of the Etchegoin Formation in the middle.

Fossils
It preserves numerous fossils dating back to the  Neogene Period of the Cenozoic Era, including mollusks.

See also

 
 
 List of fossiliferous stratigraphic units in California
 Paleontology in California

References

Bartow, J.A., 1991, The Cenozoic evolution of the San Joaquin Valley, California: U.S. Geological Survey Professional Paper 1501, 40 p.
Goudkoff, P.P., 1943, Correlation of oil field formations on west side of San Joaquin Valley, in Jenkins, O.P., ed., Geologic formations and economic development of the oil and gas fields of California: San Francisco, Calif., State of California, Department of Natural Resources, Division of Mines Bulletin No. 118, p. 247-252.

Neogene California
Geology of Fresno County, California
Geology of Kern County, California
Geography of Kings County, California
Geography of the San Joaquin Valley
Pliocene geology
Oil fields in Kern County, California
Geologic formations of California